The Very Best Of (2001) is a greatest hits album by Jethro Tull. It includes some of the band's biggest hits from 1969 to the present day. Ian Anderson selected the tracks himself, approving edits necessary for timing purposes, e.g. "Heavy Horses".

Track listing

Charts

Certifications

References

External links 
 The Very Best Of at Collecting Tull

Jethro Tull (band) compilation albums
2001 greatest hits albums